Scientists study the behaviour of isolated cells grown in the laboratory for insights into how cells function in the body in health and disease. Experiments using cell culture are used for developing new diagnostic tests and new treatments for diseases.
This is a list of major breast cancer cell lines that are primarily used in breast cancer research.

List of cell lines

Notes

References